Yevgeni Nosov may refer to:
Yevgeni Nosov (writer) (1925–2002), Russian writer
Yevgeny Nosov (rower) (born 1983), Belarusian rower